The 2009–10 CONCACAF Champions League was the second edition of the CONCACAF Champions League under its current format, and overall the 45th edition of the premier football club competition organized by CONCACAF, the regional governing body of North America, Central America and the Caribbean. The tournament began on July 28, 2009 and ran through April 28, 2010. All four Mexican teams topped their groups and reached the semi-finals, with Pachuca winning the final against Cruz Azul with a 2–2 aggregate score, via the away goals rule. As winners, Pachuca qualified for the 2010 FIFA Club World Cup as the CONCACAF representative. Atlante are the defending champions, but failed to qualify and cannot defend titles.

Qualification

24 teams participated in the 2009–10 CONCACAF Champions League from the North American, Central American, and Caribbean zones. Nine of the teams came from North America, twelve from Central America, and three from the Caribbean. However, after problems in the previous year's tournament, CONCACAF decided that teams may be disqualified and replaced if they don't have a stadium for the tournament that CONCACAF deems suitable.

 Central America: 12 Central American clubs can qualify to the Champions League. If one or more clubs is precluded, it will be supplanted by a club from another Central American federation. The reallocation would be based on results from the 2008–09 CONCACAF Champions League.
 Caribbean: If any Caribbean club is precluded, it will supplanted by the "2009 CFU Club Championship" 4th-place finisher.

Also, in response to fixture congestion during the previous year's tournament, the Central American representatives that qualify via split seasons will no longer play-off solely to determine which team will gain entry into the Group Stage. In nations that regularly play a playoff to determine a national champion, these will continue as usual. For those that don't, total points over both seasons, followed by other tiebreakers, will determine which team enters the Group Stage without playing extra matches.

Reallocation of bids

It was announced on May 12, 2009 that Belize had lost their lone qualification to Honduras due to the inability of the Belize federation to meet CONCACAF's minimum requirements in regards to stadium facilities. The spot vacated by Belize was awarded to Honduras, increasing their total to three qualified clubs, due to their association's teams' superior performance in the 2008–09 Champions League.

A second bid was reallocated on June 9 when it was determined that Real Estelí of Nicaragua did not have a suitable venue to host a CONCACAF club match. The Nicaraguan bid was initially intended to be given to a third team from Panama, but Panama only had one stadium pass inspection, which under CONCACAF rules, meant that only two Panamanian clubs could host matches. Thus, the bid was awarded to a third team from Costa Rica, Herediano, the highest non-champion from the combined 2008 Invierno and 2009 Verano seasons. Initially, there was a tie between Costa Rica, El Salvador, and Guatemala, based upon the results of the 2008–09 Champions League, for the reallocated Nicaraguan bid. Therefore, CONCACAF officials drew on results from previous CONCACAF tournaments in order to break the tie, which proved Costa Rica to historically have the strongest representation.

On July 10, 2009 CONCACAF announced that Luís Ángel Firpo of El Salvador was invited to take the place of Chalatenango due to Chalatengo's failure to sign and return the required participation agreement. Firpo was selected as the team with the second-best cumulative record among the runners-up in the El Salvadoran Apertura and Clausura championships.

Teams
Teams in bold qualify directly for the Group Stage.

1 Columbus Crew were both the 2008 MLS Supporters' Shield and 2008 MLS Cup winner, so Houston Dynamo claimed the second USA berth in the group stage as the 2008 MLS Supporters' Shield runners-up.

2 Berth originally awarded to Nicaragua (Real Estelí), was rescinded after a failed stadium inspection by CONCACAF officials. The berth was awarded to Costa Rica.

3 Berth originally awarded to Belize (Belize Defence Force), but Belize failed the CONCACAF stadium requirements. The berth was awarded to Honduras.

4 Isidro Metapán won both the 2008 Apertura and 2009 Clausura. As a result, the second Salvadoran bid was awarded to the runners-up in the Apertura and Clausura tournaments with the better aggregate record, Chalatenango (2008 Apertura runners-up). When Chalatenango failed to file the required participation agreement, the runners-up with the second-best aggregate record were invited.

Format

There will be a two-legged Preliminary Round for 16 clubs, with the eight winners advancing to the Group Stage. The other eight qualified teams will be seeded directly into the Group Stage. The clubs involved in the Group Stage will be placed into four groups of four with each team playing the others in its group in both home and away matches. The top two teams from each group will advance to the Championship Round, which will consist of two-legged ties. The Final Round, to be held in late April 2010, will also be two-legged. The away goals rule will be used, but will not apply once a tie enters extra time.

Schedule

Preliminary round

The draw for the preliminary round was held on June 11, 2009, at the CONCACAF headquarters in New York City. The first legs of the preliminary round were played the week of July 28, 2009, while the second legs were played the week of August 4, 2009; this is a month earlier than the previous season. The Preliminary Round schedule was announced on June 16, five days after the draw.

|}

Group stage

The Group Stage was played in 6 rounds during August–October 2009. The rounds were August 18–20, August 25–27, September 15–17, September 22–24, September 29–October 1, and October 20–22.

Group A

Group B

Group C

Group D

Championship round

The championship round draw was conducted on November 17.

Bracket

Each of the Championship rounds will be played over two legs.

Quarterfinals
The first legs of the Quarterfinals were played the week of March 9, 2010, while the second legs were played the week of March 16, 2010.

|}

Semifinals
The first legs of the Semifinals were played the week of March 30, 2010, while the second legs were played the week of April 6, 2010.

|}

Final

The first leg of the Final was played on April 21, 2010, while the second leg was played on April 28, 2010.

|}

Top goalscorers

References

External links

 
CONCACAF Champions League seasons
1